The PSA Annual Awards is an annual awarding ceremony organized by the Philippine Sportswriters Association (PSA) held to honor individual Filipinos or teams for their contribution in sports in the year prior save for certain awards. The PSA is the oldest extant media organization in the Philippines, having been established in 1949. Its membership consists of sportswriters and editors from various tabloids, newspapers, and sports websites in the Philippines.

Several awards are given to Filipino athletes annually, with the most prestigious recognition being the "Athlete of the Year" award.

Awards given

Athlete of the Year

Other major awards
The sports media body also gives other major awards reserved for sports executives, coaches, and athletes of specific sports.

Lifetime Achievement Award
President's Award
Executive of the Year
National Sports Association of the Year
Mr. Basketball
Ms. Basketball
Coach of the Year
Ms. Volleyball
Mr. Volleyball
Mr. Football
Ms. Football
Ms. Golf
Lifetime/Special Award for Sports Journalism

Editions

References

Philippine sports trophies and awards
Sports trophies and awards
Mr. Football awards
Award ceremonies in the Philippines